Buti may refer to:

Places
 Buti, Tuscany, Italy
 Buti-ye Bala, Sistan and Baluchestan Province, Iran
 Buti-ye Pain, Sistan and Baluchestan Province, Iran
 Cascine di Buti, province of Pisa, Italy

Other
 Buti (given name)
 Buti (surname)
 buti, also known as tiririt, a type of small dinghy used in the Philippines